The Los Alamos Historical Museum is housed in the historic Guest House, located next to Fuller Lodge, of Los Alamos Ranch School, which was General Leslie Groves's favorite place to stay during the Manhattan Project. 

The museum features exhibits on the geological history of the Pajarito Plateau, including the volcanic explosion that created the world's second largest caldera, known as the Valles Caldera. It also has displays on the early settlers of the area, the Ancestral Pueblo Indians and the early homesteaders. The museum displays the history of the Los Alamos Ranch School, an elite educational institution for wealthy boys. It was founded by Ashley Pond II using the methods of the Boy Scouts of America to build both the bodies and the minds of boys, who wore shorts as part of their school uniforms, even during the winter. The school closed in 1943 when the United States government seized the property for the Manhattan Project, the top secret project to create the atomic bomb. Photos and artifacts in the museum document this time and tell the stories of the people who lived it.

The museum also has an area for traveling exhibits which have featured a wide variety of exhibitions about New Mexico history and World War II.

References 
 Chambers, Marjorie Bell and Linda Aldrich. Los Alamos New Mexico, A Survey to 1949. Los Alamos Historical Society.
 Church, Fermor S. and Peggy Pond. When Los Alamos Was A Ranch School. Los Alamos Historical Society, 1998.

External links
 Los Alamos Historical Museum - official site
 Fuller Lodge - The Manhattan Project, An Interactive History, retrieved April 2, 2008

Museums in Los Alamos County, New Mexico
Natural history museums in New Mexico
Education museums in the United States
Buildings and structures in Los Alamos County, New Mexico